Pierre Claes (23 October 1901 – 24 May 1989) was a Belgian racing cyclist. He rode in the 1927 Tour de France.

References

1901 births
1989 deaths
Belgian male cyclists
Place of birth missing